Gary Wheadon (born 1 February 1981 in Welkom) is a South African professional squash player. He reached a career-high world ranking of 114 in March 2008.

References

1981 births
Living people
South African male squash players
21st-century South African people